Asperula cynanchica, the squinancywort or squincywort, is a species of flowering plant in the family Rubiaceae. Its common name is derived from its former use as a medicinal herb to cure quinsy. It is native to much of southern and central Europe from Spain and Ireland to Russia.

In Sweden, the roots have been used as a red dyeing agent.

Description and habitat
It is a perennial plant and grows in short grassland or sand dunes on calcareous soils. The flowers are small and can be either pink or white.

References

External links
World Checklist of Rubiaceae

cyanchica
Flora of Europe
Plants described in 1753
Taxa named by Carl Linnaeus